"Love Never Fails" is a song by Christian contemporary-alternative rock musician Brandon Heath from his second studio album, What If We. It was released on February 5, 2009, as the third single from the album.

Background 
This song was produced by Dan Muckala.  Brandon Heath sang this song at Carrie Underwood's and Mike Fisher's wedding.

Composition 
"Love Never Fails" was written by Brandon Heath, Chad Cates.

Release 
The song "Love Never Fails" was digitally released as the third and last single from What If We on February 5, 2009.

Charts

References 

2009 singles
Brandon Heath songs
Songs written by Brandon Heath
2008 songs
Song recordings produced by Dan Muckala